The 1952 Penn Quakers football team represented the University of Pennsylvania during the 1952 college football season.  In George Munger's 14th season as head coach, the Quakers compiled a 4–3–2 record, and outscored their opponents 122 to 107.  They achieved a 1–0–1 record against ranked teams, knocking off top-ten Princeton and tying a Notre Dame team that would finish ranked third nationally.

Schedule

References

Penn
Penn Quakers football seasons
Penn Quakers football